The Gomera Socialist Group (ASG) is a minor political party in Spain operating on the island of La Gomera in the Canary Islands. It was founded in 2015 by Casimiro Curbelo, current President of the Cabildo de La Gomera, after breaking away from the local branch of the Spanish Socialist Workers' Party (PSOE). It is currently in the administration of 5 of the 6 municipalities of La Gomera.

Electoral Results

References

Political parties in the Canary Islands
Social democratic parties in Spain
2015 establishments in the Canary Islands